Nauru is a small, isolated western Pacific island, which lacks many of the tourist facilities of some of its larger neighbours, such as Fiji, the Cook Islands, or even New Caledonia.  Tourism is not a major contributor to the economy, with only around 200 tourists a year visiting the island.

Getting to Nauru
Nauru International Airport is the sole airport on the island. Nauru Airlines, formerly known as Air Nauru and Our Airline, is the only passenger airline operating to the island. It operates four passenger (and one cargo) Boeing 737-300 aircraft out of Brisbane, Australia, and provides an air link to Nadi, Honiara, Tarawa, Majuro, and Brisbane.

Accommodation
There are four hotels in Nauru, including the Menen Hotel, the largest hotel on the island, and the OD-N-Aiwo Hotel. The Menen hosts two restaurants, the Anibare and the Oriental, and one bar. These facilities offer views of Anibare bay, off the east coast of the island.

The OD-N-Aiwo Hotel is located in Aiwo District. While smaller than the Menen Hotel, it is the tallest building in Nauru. The hotel is a complex of three to four stories, and it is run as a private family business. It is the cheaper one of the two hotels on Nauru, and it is popular with backpackers. There are two restaurants, which offer Oriental, Western and Pacific style cuisine, a laundry, a car rental agency, and taxi service to Nauru International Airport.

Leisure activities
The region is covered by the sandy coastline and coconut trees. Deep sea game fishing is offered by several local businesses, with privately owned boats available for charter. Scuba diving equipment is available on Nauru; the surrounding waters provide various wreck diving opportunities.

See also

 Visa policy of Nauru
 Economy of Nauru

References

 
Nauru